HMS Euryalus was a  of the Royal Navy. She was laid down at Chatham Dockyard on 21 October 1937, launched on 6 June 1939, and commissioned 30 June 1941. Euryalus was the last cruiser built at the dockyard.

Mediterranean service

Malta convoys 
On 17 September 1941 Euryalus joined the escort for convoy WS 11X from Glasgow to Gibraltar. From 24 to 30 September 1941 she was part of Operation Halberd, one of the Malta Convoys. Two days later the force was spotted by Italian scout planes. Italian air attacks launched from Sardinia began on 27 September. The battleship Nelson was hit by a torpedo north of the Galite Islands. That evening the freighter Imperial Star was sunk north of Cap Bon. On 1 October Euryalus became part of Force W at Gibraltar.

Euryalus joined the 15th Cruiser Squadron at Alexandria on 11 November 1941 for service with the Mediterranean Fleet. On 15 December 1941 Euryalus, Naiad and eight destroyers deployed from Alexandria under Rear-Admiral Philip Vian as an escort for the freighter , bound for Malta. On 17 December Vian's force rendezvoused with Force K from Malta, and a brief engagement took place with units of the Italian fleet. Euryalus and the rest of the squadron sailed for Alexandria the following day.

On 12 February 1942 Euryalus was part of Vian's Force B deployed to cover Convoy MW 9, with HMS Naiad,  and eight destroyers. The convoy came under heavy German air attack on 14 February, and the merchant ship Clan Chattan was scuttled. Vian's ships returned to Alexandria on the morning of 15 February. On 22 March 1942 she was involved in the Second Battle of Sirte. From 12 to 16 June 1942 Euryalus was part of Operation Vigorous, another Malta supply convoy, starting at Alexandria, Port Said and Haifa. The escorting force included the old battleship , the cruisers  (flagship of Rear-Admiral Vian), HMS Dido, HMS Hermione, HMS Euryalus,  (flagship of Rear-Admiral W. G. Tennant), the anti-air cruiser , 19 destroyers, 9 escort destroyers, 4 corvettes, 2 minesweepers, 2 tugs and 4 motor torpedo boats. On 16 June HMS Hermione was sunk by the U-boat .

On 23 January 1943 Euryalus, in company with HMS Cleopatra and the destroyers ,  and  bombarded German-Italian forces at Zuara.

Invasion of Sicily 
On 10 July 1943 Euryalus was part of Operation Husky, the allied amphibious landings on Sicily. For the operation Euryalus was assigned was to cover the attacking forces, together with other elements of Force H, under Vice-Admiral Algernon Willis. The reserve force comprised the battleships ,  and six destroyers. The invasion was further supported by three monitors, four cruisers, four AA ships, 47 destroyers, 20 submarines, 327 landing ships and 715 landing boats of all kinds, 296 minor vessels and 155 transport vessels. The United States Navy deployed five cruisers, 48 destroyers, 190 landing ships, 510 landing boats, 510 other vessels and 66 transport vessels, with a further 31 warships from the Netherlands, Poland, Belgium, Norway and Greece.

Operation Avalanche 
HMS Euryalus was involved in Operation Avalanche, the amphibious landings at Salerno on 9 September 1943 as part of Rear-Admiral Vian's Task Force 88.

Service in the Far East 
Euryalus joined the 4th Cruiser Squadron at Trincomalee, Ceylon in January 1945, becoming part of the British Eastern Fleet. On 24 January she took part in Operation Meridian I, covering carrier-launched attacks on refineries at Pladjoe, Sumatra. On 2 February Euryalus arrived at Fremantle, Australia, to transfer to the British Pacific Fleet (BPF).

British Pacific Fleet 

Euryalus arrived at Sydney on 11 February 1945. She sailed from there on 28 February to the British Forward Base at Manus, where she joined the British Pacific Fleet on arrival on 7 March. There the fleet awaited the approval of the US Chiefs of Staff for Royal Navy ships to join US Navy operations in the south-west Pacific. On 17 March Euryalus sailed for the US Navy Assembly area at Ulithi to join in USN operations. She arrived there on 20 March arrived and joined the United States Fifth Fleet for operations against Japan and the Imperial Japanese Navy (IJN). On 23 March she sailed from Ulithi as part of CTU 6 with the 25th, 27th and 4th RAN destroyer flotillas to join US operations off the Sakishima Gunto islands group, as part of Operation Iceberg 1. On 1 April she transferred with the Task Force 57 carriers to cover air attacks on Formosa. On 12 April, as part of Operation Iceberg Oolong, she provided covered during attacks on Shinchiku and Matsugama. The next day Euryalus rejoined US ships off Sakishima Gunto. She deployed with Task Force 57 during the final strike of Phase 1 of the Sakishima Gunto attacks. On 1 May she rejoined US Task Force 45 with Task Force 57 carriers to continue the attacks on Sakishima Gunto. Three days later Operation Iceberg 2 began, resuming the attacks on Sakishima Gunto.

On 27 May Euryalus, with the other ships of the Royal Navy, transferred to US Task Force 37, as changes were made in the organisation of the US Fleet. She was at Brisbane on 4 June for repair and maintenance, then sailed to Manus. From Manus she sailed on 6 July for operations in preparation for Operation Olympic, the invasion of Japan. On 17 July she deployed with Task Force 37, joining ships of US Task Force 38 to provide cover during air attacks on targets in the Tokyo – Yokohama area, including airfields and the seaplane base at Kitaura. On 24 July she covered Task Force 37 carriers during air attacks on Osaka and Katori as well as attacks on shipping. On 9 August she covered the same Task Force during attacks on airfields and shipping in north Honshu and Hokkaido. On 12 August she took passage to Manus due to a shortage of fuel oil from British support tankers.

Euryalus transferred back to Royal Navy control on 15 August, after the surrender of Japan. On 29 August 1945 she entered Hong Kong with HMS Swiftsure and the landing ship .

Post-war service 
Euryalus was the last original Dido operational in Royal Navy, until 1954, mainly on the South Atlantic station. The ship was the most modernised of the original Didos, having been extensively updated from October 1943 to June 1944 at John Brown on the Clyde with new light anti-aircraft armament of 20 mm, 40 mm and 2-pounder mountings and a generally new radar suite with Type 293 radar the standard post-war Royal Navy target indicator and close-range air and surface search, Type 272 heightfinders and surface warning and new navigation radar. After the end of World War II Euryalus spent 18 further months in the Pacific Fleet operating from Sydney, Japan and Hong Kong before returning to the UK for a year-long modernisation at Rosyth in 1947–48. By this time the long range airwarning radar on Euryalus was the late war Type 279b/281, the precursor of the post-1945, Type 960. Photos reveal that Euryaluss  turrets were also modified externally in the same way as s and s with the insertion in the turret for operators of a large Perspex sighting windows. The $4.5 million cost of Royalists update to a 1950s fleet picket standard ruled this out.

Notes

References

External links 

 

Dido-class cruisers
Ships built in Chatham
1939 ships
World War II cruisers of the United Kingdom
Cold War cruisers of the United Kingdom